The Slovechna is a river in Zhytomyr Oblast, Ukraine and Gomel Region, Belarus. It is a right tributary of the Pripyat River.

References 

Rivers of Zhytomyr Oblast
Rivers of Gomel Region
Rivers of Belarus